Dyrhólaey ("door hill island"), formerly known by seamen as Cape Portland, is a small promontory located on the south coast of Iceland, not far from the village Vík. It was formerly an island of volcanic origin, which is also known by the Icelandic word eyja  meaning island. The volcano erupted about 100 thousand years ago during the Pleistocene.

The view from Dyrhólaey is broad: To the north is to be seen the big glacier Mýrdalsjökull. To the east, the black lava columns of the Reynisdrangar come out of the sea, and to the west the whole coastline in the direction of Selfoss is visible – depending on weather conditions. In front of the peninsula, there is a gigantic black arch of lava standing in the sea, which gave the peninsula its name (meaning: door hill island).

In the summertime, many Atlantic puffins can be found nesting on the cliff faces of Dyrhólaey.

See also 
 Volcanism of Iceland

References

External links 

 Information
 Dyrhólaey website

Bird cliffs of Iceland
Former islands
Inselbergs of Iceland
Landforms of Iceland
Natural arches
Peninsulas of Iceland
Pleistocene volcanoes
Rock formations of Europe
Southern Region (Iceland)
Tourist attractions in Iceland
Volcanoes of Iceland